Alexis Jacquemin (24 July 1938 – 14 August 2004) was a Belgian economist. He received his PhD at the Université catholique de Louvain in 1967 and eventually became a professor at the same university in 1974. In 1983, he was awarded the Francqui Prize on Human Sciences.

Major publications
L'entreprise et son pouvoir de marché, 1967, (Spanish transl. La Empresa y su Dominio del Mercado, 1969).
La double imposition économique des bénéfices des sociétés et les mesures d'allègement, Louvain, 1968.
Le droit économique, 1970.
Fondements d'économie politique, 1970, new ed., 1986.
La magistrature économique - De economische magistratuur, ed. with G. Schrans, 1976.
Aspects juridiques de l'intervention des pouvoirs publics dans la vie économique, 1976.
Market Structure, Corporate Behaviour and the State (ed.), 1976.
Welfare Aspects of Industrial Markets (ed.), 1977.
Public Enterprise in the EEC, Part I : Belgium, Luxemburg, 1978.
Economie industrielle européenne, 1975, 2nd ed. 1979; Spanish transl.1982, Portuguese 1984).
European Industrial Organization, 1977, (It. transl.1979, Hungarian, 1981).
Les magistratures économiques et la crise, 1984.
European Industry : Public Policy and Corporate Strategy (ed.), 1984.
Sélection et Pouvoir dans la Nouvelle Economie Industrielle, 1985
The New Industrial Organization, 1987, (transl. in Dutch, German, Italian, Spanish and Japanese).
L'enjeu européen de 1992 (Cecchini-report), (contr.), 1988.
The Economics of 1992, (contr.), 1988.
The European internal market, trade and competition (ed.), 1989.
Barriers to entry and strategic competition, (co-authored), 1990.
Competition Policy in Europe and North America : economic issues and institutions, (co-authored), 1990.
Mergers and Competition Policy in the EC, De Vries Lectures in Economics, 1991
Fondements d'économie politique, with Henry Tulkens and Paul Mercier, 3d ed., 2001

External links
 Alexis Jacquemin (UCL)

Academic staff of the Université catholique de Louvain
Belgian economists
Walloon people
University of Liège alumni
1938 births
2004 deaths